Come Tomorrow is the ninth studio album by Dave Matthews Band, and was released on June 8, 2018. The album is their first since 2012's Away from the World.

Recording
Working between tours at studios in Seattle, Los Angeles and Charlottesville, Dave Matthews Band chose to record with several different producers, including John Alagia, Mark Batson, Rob Cavallo and Rob Evans.

Nine of the 14 tracks on Come Tomorrow were played live prior to the official album announcement on April 25, 2018. "Do You Remember" was debuted at Farm Aid in 2017, "Again and Again" appeared on DMB setlists in 2016 as "Bob Law", "Samurai Cop" had been a regular at Dave solo, Dave & Tim acoustic and full band shows since 2016, "Here on Out" was played live just once before the announcement and that came on the Seasons of Cuba PBS-televised special in 2016 with Dave being backed by the Chamber Orchestra of Havana. The band had regularly featured "Black and Blue Bird" and "Virginia in the Rain" at shows since 2015.

The longest-tenured songs on the album are "Can't Stop" and "Idea of You", both of which had been in the band's rotation since 2006. It was originally reported that “Come On Come On” was written in 2008, at an early session of the band's recording of Big Whiskey and the GrooGrux King, but the October 2018 leak of “The Batson Sessions” revealed that the song (previously titled “Come On”) was virtually unchanged from an April 2006 session with Mark Batson. An extended version of "bkdkdkdd" was previously performed live under the title "Be Yourself".

The cover art for the album was illustrated by Béatrice Coron.

Commercial performance
Come Tomorrow debuted at number one on the US Billboard 200 with 292,000 album-equivalent units, making it the biggest sales week for a rock album in over four years, and the biggest sales week for an album in 2018, with 285,000 copies sold. It is also their seventh consecutive album to achieve the No. 1 spot on the Billboard 200.

Track listing
The track listing for the album was announced on May 2, 2018.

All songs written by David J. Matthews except where noted.

Personnel
Dave Matthews Band
Carter Beauford – drums , buckets 
Jeff Coffin – tenor saxophone , baritone saxophone , soprano saxophone 
Stefan Lessard – bass guitar 
Dave Matthews – vocals , acoustic guitars , electric guitars , guitars , baritone guitars , Fender Rhodes , Wurlitzer , piano , bass guitar , percussion 
Tim Reynolds – electric guitars , guitars 
Rashawn Ross – trumpet , flugelhorn , bass trumpet , horn arrangements , backing vocals 
Boyd Tinsley – violin 
LeRoi Moore – alto saxophone , tenor saxophone 

Additional musicians

 Nico Abondolo – bass 
 Tawatha Agee – backing vocals 
 Candice Anderson – backing vocals 
 John Alagía – piano , Hammond B3 organ , Moog , guitar , Nord lead , electric guitar , baritone guitar , backing vocals 
 Mark Batson – piano , clavinet , Fender Rhodes , Moog 
 Steven Becknell – French horn 
 Charlie Bisharat – violin 
 Chris Bleth – clarinet 
 Robert Brophy – viola 
 Sharon Bryant-Gallwey – backing vocals 
 David Campbell – string arrangement 
 Brandi Carlile - vocals 
 Rob Cavallo – organ , Wurlitzer 
 Luis Conte – percussion 
 Mario DeLeon – violin 
 Andrew Duckels – viola 
 Karen Elaine – viola 
 Rob Evans – wah pedal and claps 
 Joe Fatheringham – trumpet 
 Matt Funes – cello 
 Gary Grant – trumpet , flugelhorn 
 Tammy Hatwan – violin 
 Jerry Hey – horn arrangements 
 Dan Higgins – tenor saxophone 
 Alex Iles – trombone 
 Alan Kaplan – trombone , bass trombone 
 Oliver Kraus – strings , string arrangements 
 Stephen Kujala – flute 
 Timothy Landasuer – cello 
 Songa Lee – violin 
 Natalie Leggett – violin 
 Dane Little – cello 
 Serena McKinney – violin 
 Joseph Meyer – French horn 
 Grace Oh – violin 
 Alyssa Park – violin 
 David Parmeter – bass 
 Sara Perkins – violin 
 Bill Reichenbach – trombone , bass trumpet 
 Michelle Richards – violin 
 Steve Richards – cello 
 Amy Sanchez – French horn 
 Tereza Stanislauv – violin 
 Rudolph Stein – cello 
 Buddy Strong – Hammond B3 organ 
 Butch Taylor – piano 
 Josephina Vergara – viola 

Technical personnel
 Engineers – Doug McKean , Rob Evans , Steven Miller , Matt Dyson , Chris Kress 
 Additional engineering – Matt Dyson , Aaron Fessel , John Alagía , Rob Evans , Pedro Calloni , Chris Kress , Jason Shavey , Sean Quackenbush , Julian Anderson 
 Assistant engineers – Tom Rasulo , Andrew Ching , Andy Park , Julian Anderson , Rob Evans , Wesley Seidman 
 Mixing engineers – John Alagía , Rob Evans , Doug McKean , Billy Centenaro 
 Mastering engineer – Brad Blackwood
 Executive producer – John Alagía

Charts

Weekly charts

Year-end charts

References

2018 albums
Albums produced by John Alagía
Albums produced by Mark Batson
Albums produced by Rob Cavallo
Dave Matthews Band albums
RCA Records albums